is a Japanese anime broadcast by TV Tokyo from October 5, 2003 to March 28, 2004.

Story
The premise of the story is that a group of children are brought into the "Realm World" when playing an online game, they have to finish a competition in two separated groups before getting back home.

Characters
Tomoru(トモル)(Voiced by:Shizuka Ishikawa)

Miho(ミオ)(Voiced by:Kazusa Murai)

Dai(ダイ)(Voiced by:Etsuko Kozakura)

Yukio(ユキオ)(Voiced by:Junko Minagawa)

Suzuka(スズカ)(Voiced by:Rie Kugimiya)

Kota(コータ)(Voiced by:Chigusa Ikeda)

External links
 Anime Homepage

2003 anime television series debuts
Action anime and manga
Adventure anime and manga
Science fiction anime and manga
OLM, Inc.
2004 Japanese television series endings
TV Tokyo original programming
Anime with original screenplays